Schneider Creek is a stream in  Mason and 
Thurston counties in the U.S. state of Washington. It is a tributary to Totten Inlet.

Schneider Creek was named after Konrad Schneider.

References

Rivers of Mason County, Washington
Rivers of Thurston County, Washington
Rivers of Washington (state)